Jeff Steve Harris (June 10, 1935 – February 2, 2004) was an American television actor, producer and writer. He was the co-creator of the American television family sitcom Diff'rent Strokes, which he created with Bernie Kukoff.

Harris co-scripted the 1984 film Johnny Dangerously with Bernie Kukoff, Harry Colomby and Norman Steinberg. His other credits include, Roseanne, Love, American Style, Operation Petticoat, Detective School and The New Dick Van Dyke Show. He also appeared in two Broadway plays Winesburg, Ohio and Tall Story. Harris died in February 2004 of emphysema in his sleep, at his home in East Hampton, New York, at the age of 68.

Filmography

Acting work

Producing work

Writing work

References

External links 

1935 births
2004 deaths
American television writers
American television actors
American television producers
Deaths from emphysema
20th-century American screenwriters